Flexbourg is a commune in the Bas-Rhin department in Grand Est in north-eastern France.

Decline and revival
Between 1806 and 1836 the registered population increased from 524 to 622, before falling back to 265 by 1962. Since then it has picked up, to stand at 499 in 2012.

See also
 Communes of the Bas-Rhin department

References

Communes of Bas-Rhin